Bobby Reid (born 9 October 1955) is a Scottish former professional footballer who played as a central defender for St Mirren, making 145 appearances in the Scottish Football League between 1973 and 1980.

References

1955 births
Living people
Scottish footballers
Kilwinning Rangers F.C. players
St Mirren F.C. players
Scottish Football League players
Association football central defenders
Scotland under-21 international footballers